Cameraria philippinensis is a moth of the family Gracillariidae. It is known from Luzon in the Philippines.

The wingspan is 4–6 mm.

The larvae feed on Bauhinia malabarica. They mine the leaves of their host plant. The mine has the form of a blotch mine occurring on the upper surface of the leaves, usually on veins. It is nearly circular in shape and blackish purple in colour. The upper epidermis of the mining part is strongly contorted to form a round dome, thus the lower side of the mine is longitudinally folded upwardly to form a round, dome-like mine-cavity. The pupation takes place inside this mine-cavity within a rough cocoon.

References

Cameraria (moth)

Leaf miners
Moths of the Philippines
Moths described in 1995
Taxa named by Tosio Kumata